Hendrik Johannes "Rik" Grashoff (born 5 April 1961, in Krimpen aan den IJssel) is a Dutch engineer and politician. He is a member of the political party GreenLeft. From 23 November 2010 to 19 September 2012 he was a member of the House of Representatives. He focused on matters of agriculture, defense and public administration. On 20 May 2015 he returned to the House and took up the seat of Bram van Ojik.

Biography
Grashoff studied civil engineering at Delft University of Technology. From 1983 to 1984 he was a member of the National Students Trade Union. He worked as a civil engineer before becoming a full-time politician.

From 1998 to 2006 he was an alderman of the municipality of Delft, where his responsibilities included transportation. From 2008 to 2010 he was an alderman of the municipality of Rotterdam. His responsibilities included culture and participation.

On 6 June 2018, Grashoff announced he would resign as member of the House of Representatives.

References 
  Parlement.com biography

1961 births
Living people
Municipal councillors of Delft
Aldermen in South Holland
People from Delft
Aldermen of Rotterdam
Chairmen of GroenLinks
Delft University of Technology alumni
Dutch civil engineers
Dutch trade unionists
GroenLinks politicians
Members of the House of Representatives (Netherlands)
People from Krimpen aan den IJssel
21st-century Dutch politicians